East Rock is a neighborhood in the city of New Haven, Connecticut, named for nearby East Rock, a prominent trap rock ridge. The area is home to a large group of Yale students, staff, and faculty, as well as many young professionals and families.  Writing in the Times Literary Supplement, Hirsh Sawhney describes East Rock as a "yuppie enclave", which is "increasingly composed of wealthy professionals and graduate students, most of whom are affiliated with Yale University, whose lavish campus lies just over a mile away" East Rock is also a popular destination for cyclists, as a city bike lane runs along Orange Street, the neighborhood's spine. East Rock is the safest neighborhood in New Haven County. East Rock is home to East Rock Park, which is frequently visited by families and tourists.

History 

The current East Rock neighborhood remained unsettled farmland into the 1800s, when its largest landowner was Abraham Bishop, a prominent New Haven lawyer and businessman. The southernmost streets were developed first, between the late 1830s and 1860, as these were nearest to the industrializing city center. Following Bishop's death in 1844, the rest of the neighborhood was gradually subdivided and developed.

Sub-neighborhoods developed as New Haven continued to industrialize and grow, with immigrants arriving to take newly available jobs. An Irish community developed in Goatville (around Upper State Street) and a Polish population formed around St. Stanislaus Roman Catholic Church. A commercial district developed on Upper State Street. By 1900 most of the neighborhood's land was developed. The final blocks, near East Rock Park, were developed in the first decades of the 1900s.

Throughout its history East Rock has contained residences of faculty and alumni from neighboring Yale University. As the university has grown, the East Rock neighborhood has increasingly housed the university's graduate students and researchers while many faculty now live outside New Haven's borders.

During the late 20th century a series of businesses were developed on primarily residential Orange St, including markets and coffee shops. During the 2010s a large-scale addition of 238 apartments was constructed on the 'Corsair' site, a former airplane propeller factory on Upper State Street.

Geography 

The neighborhood is bordered on the north by the town of Hamden, on the east by Amtrak railroad tracks, on the southeast by Interstate 91 (between Exits 3 and 6), on the south by Trumbull Street, and on the west by Whitney Avenue. The northeast corner of the area, separated from the main neighborhood by the Mill River and the East Rock hill, is part of the community known as Cedar Hill.

The neighborhood is divided between New Haven's ninth and tenth aldermanic wards.  Before redistricting, it lay in the fifteenth ward; the area was the subject of William Lee Miller's book The Fifteenth Ward and the Great Society. The western half of the neighborhood (west of Orange Street) is within the Whitney Avenue Historic District. The southerly parts of the neighborhood are also listed as historic districts: Upper State Street Historic District along State Street, and Orange Street Historic District along Orange Street. The northern portion of the neighborhood is occupied by part of East Rock Park.

Notable sites 

East Rock Park
New Haven Lawn Club
Wilbur Cross High School
Worthington Hooker School
Cedar Hill neighborhood
St. John's Episcopal Church
St. Joseph's Catholic Church
The Anderson Mansion

List of streets

References

Bibliography

Print 
 Harrison's Illustrated Guide: Greater New Haven 
 The Streets of New Haven – The Origin of Their Names, 2nd edition 1998 

Neighborhoods in New Haven, Connecticut